The election for the Hong Kong deputies to the 12th National People's Congress (NPC) was held on 19 December 2012. 36 Hong Kong deputies were elected by an electoral college composed of 1,621 members.

Overview
The election took place at the second plenary meeting of the 12th National People's Congress election meeting on 19 December. It was attended by Li Jianguo, vice-chairman and secretary-general of the National People's Congress Standing Committee (NPCSC) as the representative of the NPCSC, and presided by Leung Chun-ying, executive chairman of the 19-strong presidium which included former Chief Executives Tung Chee-hwa and Donald Tsang Yam-kuen, as well as Asia's richest man, Li Ka-shing, and Democratic Alliance for the Betterment and Progress of Hong Kong (DAB) chairman Tam Yiu-chung.
 
52 candidates ran for 36 seats with 23 outgoing delegates, including Rita Fan Hsu Lai-tai, member of the NPCSC, Maria Tam Wai-chu, deputy convenor of the Hong Kong delegation, and Fanny Law Fan Chiu-fun, Executive Council member and Chief Executive Leung Chun-ying's former top aide. New faces included former Secretary for Security Ambrose Lee Siu-kwong and Li Yinquan, vice-president of the China Merchants Group. Only two contenders are pan-democrats, Fong King-lok, executive committee member of the Hong Kong Professional Teachers' Union and Dutch-born Southern District councillor Paul Zimmerman, who quit the Civic Party in summer.

1,488 of the 1,621 electoral college members cast their votes. Each elector had to choose 36 candidates. The top 36 candidates in the ballot, as long as they receive more than 50 per cent support, would be elected. 36 of the 52 candidates were elected while 7 candidates were elected as supplementary deputies.

Election result

Elected members (36)

 Cai Yi
 Laura Cha Shih May-lung
 Bernard Charnwut Chan
 Bunny Chan Chung-bun
 Chan Yung
 Cheng Yiu-tong
 Cheung Ming-man
 Choy So-yuk
 Rita Fan Hsu Lai-tai
 Herman Hu Shao-ming
 Ian Fok Chun-wan
 Ip Kwok-him
 Dennis Lam Shun-chiu
 Miriam Lau Kin-yee
 Priscilla Lau Pui-king
 Fanny Law Fan Chiu-fun
 Ambrose Lee Siu-kwong
 Sophie Leung Lau Yau-fun
 Li Yinquan
 Martin Liao Cheung-kong
 Lo Shui-on
 Tim Lui Tim-leung
 Ma Fung-kwok
 Ma Ho-fai
 Ng Chau-pei
 Ng Leung-sing
 Ngan Po-ling
 Maria Tam Wai-chu
 Michael Tien Puk-sun
 Peter Wong Man-kong
 Wong Ting-chung
 David Wong Yau-kar
 Wong Yuk-shan
 Andrew Yao Cho-fai
 Yeung Yiu-chung
 Zhang Tiefu

Supplementary members (7)

 Albert Au Siu-cheung
 Thomas Cheung Tsun-yung
 Feng Jiu
 Raymond Leung Hai-ming
 Li Kuo-hsing
 Alice Tso Shing-yok
 To Wai-keung

Detailed results

Result by party 
Hong Kong local parties are not counted as national political parties and thus the below elected deputies will not carry their membership in the National People's Congress.

References

2012 in Hong Kong
NPC
December 2012 events in China